B-90 Sarov also referred to as Sarov class, Russian designation Project 20120 Sargan, is a Russian special purpose diesel-electric submarine that uses a nuclear reactor as a supplementary power generator. The existence of the submarine was first revealed in 2007, when details about the boat were accidentally published on the Sarov, Nizhny Novgorod region's local government website as part of an account of a meeting with its commander. It serves in the Russian Navy's Northern Fleet and is being used as a technology demonstrator for testing of upgraded weapons and military equipment or as an intelligence collection boat.

History
Sarov was designed by the Rubin Design Bureau during the 1980s and its construction began in 1989 at the Krasnoye Sormovo Shipyard, Nizhniy Novgorod. In 1998, work on the submarine was stopped due to the funding problems that arose with the dissolution of the Soviet Union. After revision of the project, work reportedly continued at the Sevmash Shipyard, Severodvinsk since 2003. Sarov was launched in 2007 and commissioned in the Russian Navy in 2008. It is named after the city of Sarov.

Design
Based on the Kilo-class submarine, it is a unique platform due to the combination of its diesel electric power system and a small nuclear reactor. It is believed the reactor does not drive the propeller itself, but rather produces electricity to recharge the conventional battery system, greatly extending the underwater endurance of the submarine. It has been noted that since electric propulsion is inherently very quiet, but tends to lack range, possession of a long range electrical system would make Sarov an excellent intelligence gathering platform. The Russian Defence Ministry has not revealed whether the boat is employed in this role.

Sarov has a crew of 52 and can stay submerged for up to 20 days. Due to the addition of a nuclear reactor section behind the submarine's sail and an escape capsule in the sail, Sarov is significantly longer (98 m) compared to the length of the original Kilo-class submarines (72 m).

Operational history
On 27 November 2016, Sarov was allegedly involved in a testing of the Russia's nuclear-powered, nuclear-armed Poseidon unmanned underwater vehicle, according to the Pentagon officials.

On 20 February 2019, Russian Defence Ministry released a video showing the Poseidon unmanned underwater vehicle as it is being launched out of a torpedo compartment aboard Sarov.

References

External links
  Krasnoye Sormovo
 Sevmash
 Russian Ships

Russian and Soviet navy submarine classes
Submarines of the Russian Navy
Experimental submarines